A semi-trailer truck, also known as a semitruck, (or semi, eighteen-wheeler, big rig, tractor-trailer or, by synecdoche, a semitrailer) is the combination of a tractor unit and one or more semi-trailers to carry freight. A semi-trailer attaches to the tractor with a type of hitch called a fifth wheel.

Regional configurations

Europe

The noticeable difference between tractor units in Europe and North America is that almost all European models are cab over engine (called "forward control" in the UK), while the majority of North American trucks are "conventional" (called "normal control" or "bonneted" in the UK).  European trucks, whether straight trucks or fully articulated, have a sheer face on the front. This allows shorter trucks with longer trailers (with larger freight capacity) within the legal maximum total length. Furthermore, it offers greater maneuverability in confined areas, a more balanced weight-distribution, and better overall view for the driver. The major disadvantage is that for repairs on COE trucks, the entire cab has to hinge forward to allow maintenance access.

In Europe, usually only the driven tractor axle has dual wheels, while single wheels are used for every other axle on the tractor and the trailer. The most common combination used in Europe is a semi tractor with two axles and a cargo trailer with three axles, one of which is sometimes a lift axle, giving 5 axles and 12 wheels in total. This format is now common across Europe as it is able to meet the EU maximum weight limit of  without overloading any axle. Individual countries have raised their own weight limit. The U.K., for example, has a  limit, an increase achieved by adding an extra axle to the tractor, usually in the form of a middle unpowered lifting axle (midlift) with a total of 14 wheels. The lift axles used on both tractors and trailers allow the trucks to remain legal when fully loaded (as weight per axle remains within the legal limits); on the other hand, these axle set(s) can be raised off the roadway for increased maneuverability or for reduced fuel consumption and tire wear when carrying lighter loads. Although lift axles usually operate automatically, they can be lowered manually even while carrying light loads, in order to remain within legal (safe) limits when, for example, navigating back-road bridges with severely restricted axle loads. For greater detail, see the United Kingdom section, below.

When using a dolly, which generally has to be equipped with lights and a license plate, rigid trucks can be used to pull semi-trailers. The dolly is equipped with a fifth wheel to which the trailer is coupled. Because the dolly attaches to a pintle hitch on the truck, maneuvering a trailer hooked to a dolly is different from maneuvering a fifth wheel trailer. Backing the vehicle requires the same technique as backing an ordinary truck/full trailer combination, though the dolly/semi setup is probably longer, thus requiring more space for maneuvering. The tractor/semi-trailer configuration is rarely used on timber trucks since they use the two major advantages of having the weight of the load on the drive wheels, and the loader crane used to lift the logs from the ground can be mounted on the rear of the truck behind the load, allowing a short (lightweight) crane to reach both ends of the vehicle without uncoupling. Also, construction trucks are more often seen in a rigid + midaxle trailer configuration instead of the tractor/semi-trailer setup.

Continental Europe

With the 50% increase in cargo weight, the fuel efficiency increases with an average of 20% with a corresponding relative decrease in carbon emissions and with the added benefit of one third fewer trucks on the road. The 1996 EU regulation defines a Europe Module System (EMS) as it was implemented in Sweden. The wording of EMS combinations and EuroCombi are now used interchangeably to point to truck combinations as specified in the EU document; however, apart from Sweden and Finland, the EuroCombi is only allowed to operate on specific roads in other EU member states. Since 1996 Sweden and Finland formally won a final exemption from the European Economic Area rules with 60 tonne and  combinations. From 2006, 25.25 m truck trailer combinations are to be allowed on restricted routes within Germany, following a similar (on-going) trial in The Netherlands. Similarly, Denmark has allowed 25.25 m combinations on select routes. These vehicles will run a  weight limit. Two types are to be used: 1) a 26-tonne truck pulling a dolly and semi-trailer, or 2) an articulated tractor unit pulling a B-double, member states gained the ability to adopt the same rules. In Italy the maximum permitted weight (unless exceptional transport is authorized) is 44 tonnes for any kind of combination with five axles or more. Czech Republic has allowed 25.25 m combinations with a permission for a selected route.

Nordic countries

Denmark and Norway allow  trucks (Denmark from 2008, and Norway from 2008 on selected routes). In Sweden, the allowed length has been  since 1967. Before that, the maximum length was unlimited; the only limitations were on axle load. What stopped Sweden from adopting the same rules as the rest of Europe, when securing road safety, was the national importance of a competitive forestry industry. Finland, with the same road safety issues and equally important forestry industry, followed suit. The change made trucks able to carry three stacks of cut-to-length logs instead of two, as it would be in a short combination. They have one stack together with a crane on the 6×4 truck, and two additional stacks on a four axle trailer. The allowed gross weight in both countries is up to  depending on the distance between the first and last axle.

In the negotiations starting in the late 1980s preceding Sweden and Finland's entries to the European Economic Area and later the European Union, they insisted on exemptions from the EU rules citing environmental concerns and the transportation needs of the logging industry. Later, B-double combinations came into use, often with one  container on the B-link and a  container (or two  containers) on a semi-trailer bed. In allowing the longer truck combinations, what would take two  semi-trailer trucks and one  truck and trailer to haul on the continent now could be handled by just two 25.25 m trucks – greatly reducing overall costs and emissions. Prepared since late 2012 and effective in January 2013, Finland has changed its regulations to allow total maximum legal weight of a combination to be . The effect this major maximum weight increase would cause to the roads and bridges in Finland over time is strongly debated.

However, longer and heavier combinations are regularly seen on public roads; special permits are issued for special cargo. The mining company Boliden AB have a standing special permit for  combinations on select routes between mines in the inland and the processing plant in Boliden, taking a   load of ore. Another example is the ongoing project En Trave Till (lit. One more pile/stack) started in December 2008. It will allow even longer vehicles to further rationalize the logging transports. As the name of the project points out, it will be able to carry four stacks of timber, instead of the usual three. The test is limited to Norrbotten county and the European route E4 between the timber terminal in Överkalix and the sawmill in Munksund (outside Piteå). It is estimated that this will give a 20% lower cost and 20-25%  emissions reduction compared to the regular   truck combinations. As the combination spreads its weight over more axles, braking distance, road wear and traffic safety is believed to be either the same or improved with the   truck-trailer. In the same program two types of   combinations will be tested in Dalsland and Bohuslän counties in western Sweden: an enhanced truck and trailer combination for use in the forest and a b-double for plain highway transportation to the mill in Skoghall. In 2012, the Northland Mining company received permission for   combinations with normal axle load (an extra dolly) for use on the  Kaunisvaara-Svappavaara route, carrying iron ore.

, the longest and heaviest truck in everyday use in Finland is operated by transport company Ketosen Kuljetus as part of a pilot project studying transport efficiency in the timber industry.

New types of vehicle combinations that differ from the current standards may also be used on the road. The requirements for combinations also include camera systems for side visibility, an advanced emergency braking and lane detector system, electronic driving stability system and electronically controlled brakes. Maximum length of a vehicle combination 34.5 metres Maximum length of a vehicle combination 34.5 metres

United Kingdom

In the United Kingdom, a semi-trailer truck is known as an 'articulated lorry' (or colloquially as an 'artic'). In order for a 44,000 kg semi-trailer truck to be permitted on UK roads the tractor and semi-trailer must have three or more axles each. Lower weight semi-trailer trucks can mean some tractors and trailer having fewer axles. In practice, as with double decker buses and coaches in the UK, there is no legal height limit for semi-trailer trucks; however, bridges over  do not have the height marked on them. Vehicles heavier than 44,000 kg are permitted on UK roads but are indivisible loads, which would be classed as abnormal (or oversize). Such vehicles are required to display an STGO (Special Types General Order) plate on the front of the tractor unit and, under certain circumstances, are required to travel by an authorized route and have an escort.

In January 2012, the Department for Transport began conducting a trial of longer semi-trailers. The increase in length will not result in the  weight limit being exceeded and will allow some operators to approach the weight limit which may not have been previously possible due to the previous length of trailers. The trial will run for a maximum of 10 years. Providing certain requirements are fulfilled, a Special Types General Order (STGO) allows for vehicles of any size or weight to travel on UK roads. However, in practice, any such vehicle has to travel by a route authorized by the Department of Transport and move under escort. The escort of abnormal loads in the UK is now predominantly carried out by private companies, but extremely large or heavy loads that require road closures must still be escorted by the police.

In the UK, some semi-trailer trucks have eight tires on three axles on the tractor; these are known as six-wheelers or "six leggers," with either the center or rear axle having single wheels which normally steer as well as the front axle and can be raised when not needed (i.e. when unloaded or only a light load is being carried; an arrangement known as a TAG axle when it is the rear axle, or mid-lift when it is the center axle).  Some trailers have two axles which have twin tires on each axle; other trailers have three axles, of which one axle can be a lift axle which has super-single wheels. In the UK, two wheels bolted to the same hub are classed as a single wheel, therefore a standard six-axle articulated truck is considered to have twelve wheels, even though it has twenty tires. The UK also allows semi-trailer truck which have six tires on two axles; these are known as four-wheelers.

In 2009, the operator Denby Transport designed and built a  B-Train (or B-Double) semi-trailer truck called the Denby Eco-Link to show the benefits of such a vehicle, which were a reduction in road accidents and result in fewer road deaths, a reduction in emissions due to the one tractor unit still being used and no further highway investment being required. This is based on the fact that for light but bulky goods such as toilet paper, plastic bottles, cereals and aluminum cans, conventional semi-trailer trucks run out of cargo space before they reach the weight limit. At , as opposed to  usually associated with B-Trains, the Eco-Link also exerts less weight per axle on the road compared to the standard six-axle  semi-trailer truck.

The vehicle was built after Denby Transport believed they had found a legal-loophole in the present UK law to allow the Eco-Link to be used on the public roads. The relevant legislation concerned the 1986 Road Vehicles Construction and Use Regulations. The point of law reportedly hinged on the definition of a "towing implement", with Denby prepared to argue that the second trailer on the Eco-Link was one. The Department for Transport were of the opinion that this refers to recovering a vehicle after an accident or breakdown, but the regulation does not explicitly state this.

During BTAC performance testing the Eco-Link was given an "excellent" rating for its performance in maneuverability, productivity, safety and emissions tests, superseding ordinary semi-trailer trucks in many respects. Reportedly, private trials had also shown the Denby vehicle had a 20% shorter stopping distance than conventional semi-trailer trucks of the same weight, due to having extra axles.

Although the Department for Transport advised that the Eco-Link was not permissible on public roads, Denby Transport gave the Police prior warning of the timing and route of the test drive on the public highway, as well as outlining their position in writing to the Eastern Traffic Area Office. On 1 December 2009 Denby Transport were preparing to drive the Eco-Link on public roads, but this was cut short because the Police pulled the semi-trailer truck over as it left the gates in order to test it for its legality "to investigate any... offenses which may be found". The Police said the vehicle was unlawful due to its length and Denby Transport was served with a notice by the Vehicle and Operator Services Agency (VOSA) inspector to remove the vehicle from the road for inspection. Having returned to the yard, Denby Transport was formally notified by Police and VOSA that the semi-trailer truck could not be used. Neither the Eco-Link, nor any other B-Train, have since been permitted on UK roads. However, this prompted the Department for Transport to undertake a desk study into semi-trailer trucks, which has resulted in the longer semi-trailer trial which commenced in 2012.

North America

In North America, the combination vehicles made up of a powered semi-tractor and one or more semitrailers are known as "semis", "semitrailers", "tractor-trailers", "big rigs", "semi-trucks", "eighteen-wheelers", or "semi-tractor-trailers".

The tractor unit typically has two or three axles; those built for hauling heavy-duty commercial-construction machinery may have as many as five, some often being lift axles.

The most common tractor-cab layout has a forward engine, one steering axle, and two drive axles. The fifth-wheel trailer coupling on most tractor trucks is movable fore and aft, to allow adjustment in the weight distribution over its rear axle(s).

Ubiquitous in Europe but less common in North America since the 1990s, is the cabover engine configuration, where the driver sits next to or over the engine. With changes in the US to the maximum length of the combined vehicle, the cabover was largely phased out of North American over-the-road (long-haul) service by 2007. Cabovers were difficult to service; for a long time, the cab could not be lifted on its hinges to a full 90-degree forward tilt, severely limiting access to the front of the engine.

, a truck could cost , while the diesel fuel cost could be $70,000 per year.

The cargo trailer usually has tandem axles at the rear, each of which has dual wheels, or eight tires on the trailer, four per axle. In the US it is common to refer to the number of wheel hubs, rather than the number of tires; an axle can have either single or dual tires with no legal difference. The combination of eight tires on the trailer and ten tires on the tractor is what led to the moniker eighteen wheeler, although this term is considered by some truckers to be a misnomer (the term "eighteen-wheeler" is a nickname for a five-axle over-the-road combination). Many trailers are equipped with movable tandem axles to allow adjusting the weight distribution.

To connect the second of a set of doubles to the first trailer, and to support the front half of the second trailer, a converter gear known as a "dolly" is used. This has one or two axles, a fifth-wheel coupling for the rear trailer, and a tongue with a ring-hitch coupling for the forward trailer. Individual states may further allow longer vehicles, known as "longer combination vehicles" (or LCVs), and may allow them to operate on roads other than Interstates.

Long combination vehicle types include:

 Doubles (officially "STAA doubles", known colloquially as "a set of joints"): Two  trailers.
 B-Doubles: Twin  trailers in B-double configuration (very common in Canada but rarely used in the United States).

 Triples: Three  trailers.

 Turnpike Doubles: Two  -  trailers.
 Rocky Mountain Doubles: One  trailer (though usually no more than ) and one  trailer (known as a "pup").
 In Canada, a Turnpike Double is two  trailers, and a Rocky Mountain Double is a  trailer with a  "pup".

The US federal government, which only regulates the Interstate Highway System, does not set maximum length requirements (except on auto and boat transporters), only minimums. Tractors can pull two or three trailers if the combination is legal in that state.

Roads other than Interstates are regulated by individual states, and laws vary widely. Most states restrict operation of larger tandem trailer setups such as triple units, turnpike doubles, and Rocky Mountain doubles. Reasons for limiting the legal trailer configurations include safety concerns and the impracticality of designing and constructing roads that can accommodate the larger wheelbase of these vehicles and the larger minimum turning radii associated with them. In general, these configurations are restricted to the Interstates. Except for these units, double setups are not restricted to certain roads any more than a single setup. They are also not restricted by weather conditions or "difficulty of operation". The Canadian province of Ontario, however, does have weather-related operating restrictions for larger tandem trailer setups.

Oceania

Australia

Australian road transport has a reputation for using very large trucks and road trains. This is reflected in the most popular configurations of trucks generally having dual drive axles and three axles on the trailers, with four tires on each axle. This means that Australian single semi-trailer trucks will usually have 22 tires, which is generally more than their counterparts in other countries. Super single tires are sometimes used on tri-axle trailers. The suspension is designed with travel limiting, which will hold the rim off the road for one blown or deflated tyre for each side of the trailer, so a trailer can be driven at reduced speed to a safe place for repair. Super singles are also often used on the steer axle in Australia to allow greater loading over the steer axle. The increase in loading of steer tires requires a permit.

Long haul transport usually operates as B-doubles with two trailers (each with three axles), for a total of nine axles (including steering). In some lighter duty applications only one of the rear axles of the truck is driven, and the trailer may have only two axles. From July 2007, the Australian Federal and State Governments allowed the introduction of B-triple trucks on a specified network of roads. B-Triples are set up differently from conventional road trains. The front of their first trailer is supported by the turntable on the prime mover. The second and third trailers are supported by turntables on the trailers in front of them. As a result, B-Triples are much more stable than road trains and handle exceptionally well. True road trains only operate in remote areas, regulated by each state or territory government.

However, heavy restrictions apply to the areas where such a vehicle may travel in most states. In remote areas such as the Northern Territory great care must be taken when sharing the road with longer articulated vehicles that often travel during the daytime, especially four-trailer road trains.

B-doubles may only operate on designated roads, which includes most highways and some major metropolitan roads. B-doubles are very common in all parts of Australia including state capitals and on major routes they outnumber single trailer configurations.

In effect, a 4.6 meter high B-double will have to follow two sets of rules: they may access only those roads that are permitted for B-doubles and for 4.6 meter high vehicles.

In Australia, both conventional prime movers and cabovers are common, however, cabovers are most often seen on B-doubles on the eastern seaboard where the reduction in total length allows the vehicle to pull longer trailers and thus more cargo than it would otherwise.

New Zealand
New Zealand legislation governing truck dimensions falls under the Vehicle Dimensions and Mass Rules, published by NZ Transport Agency. New rules were introduced effective 1 February 2017, which increased the maximum height, width and weight of loads and vehicles, to simplify regulations, increase the amount of freight carried by road, and to improve the range of vehicles and trailers available to transport operators.

Common combinations in New Zealand are a standard semi-trailer, a B-double, or a rigid towing vehicle pulling a trailer with a drawbar, with a maximum of nine axles. Standard maximum vehicle lengths for trailers with one axle set are:
 Semi-trailer: 
 Simple: 
 Pole: 
Oversized loads require, at minimum, a permit, and may require one or more pilot vehicles.

High-productivity motor vehicle (HPMV) permits are issued for vehicles exceeding 44 tonnes, or the above dimensions. Trucks up to 62 tonnes were allowed, with an initial bridge strengthening program costing $12.5m.

Construction

Types of trailers

There are many types of semi-trailers in use, designed to haul a wide range of products.

 Box, or dry van
 Bus
 Car hauler
 Intermodal chassis
 Dry bulk
 Dump
 Flatbed
 Hopper-Bottom
 Lowboy
 Refrigerator 
 Reefer
 Tanker

Coupling and uncoupling
The cargo trailer is, by means of a king pin, hooked to a horseshoe-shaped quick-release coupling device called a fifth wheel or a turntable hitch at the rear of the towing engine that allows easy hook up and release. The truck trailer cannot move by itself because it only has wheels at the rear end: it requires a forward axle, provided by the towing engine, to carry half the load weight.  When braking hard at high speeds, the vehicle has a tendency to fold at the pivot point between the towing vehicle and the trailer. Such a truck accident is called a "trailer swing", although it is also commonly described as a "jackknife." Jackknifing is a condition where the tractive unit swings round against the trailer, and not vice versa.

Braking

Semi trucks use air pressure, rather than hydraulic fluid, to actuate the brake. The use of air hoses allows for ease of coupling and uncoupling of trailers from the tractor unit. The most common failure is brake fade, usually caused when the drums or discs and the linings of the brakes overheat from excessive use.

The parking brake of the tractor unit and the emergency brake of the trailer are spring brakes that require air pressure in order to be released. They are applied when air pressure is released from the system, and disengaged when air pressure is supplied. This is a fail-safe design feature which ensures that if air pressure to either unit is lost, the vehicle will stop to a grinding halt, instead of continuing without brakes and becoming uncontrollable. The trailer controls are coupled to the tractor through two gladhand connectors, which provide air pressure, and an electrical cable, which provides power to the lights and any specialized features of the trailer.

Glad-hand connectors (also known as palm couplings) are air hose connectors, each of which has a flat engaging face and retaining tabs. The faces are placed together, and the units are rotated so that the tabs engage each other to hold the connectors together. This arrangement provides a secure connection but allows the couplers to break away without damaging the equipment if they are pulled, as may happen when the tractor and trailer are separated without first uncoupling the air lines. These connectors are similar in design to the ones used for a similar purpose between railroad cars. Two air lines typically connect to the trailer unit. An emergency or main air supply line pressurizes the trailer's air tank and disengages the emergency brake, and a second service line controls the brake application during normal operation.

In the UK, male/female quick release connectors (red line or emergency), have a female on the truck and male on the trailer,  but a yellow line or service has a male on the truck and female on the trailer. This avoids coupling errors (causing no brakes) plus the connections will not come apart if pulled by accident. The three electrical lines will fit one way around a primary black, a secondary green, and an ABS lead, all of which are collectively known as suzies or suzie coils.

Another braking feature of semi-trucks is engine braking, which could be either a compression brake (usually shortened to Jake brake) or exhaust brake or combination of both. However, the use of compression brake alone produces a loud and distinctive noise, and to control noise pollution, some local municipalities have prohibited or restricted the use of engine brake systems inside their jurisdictions, particularly in residential areas. The advantage to using engine braking instead of conventional brakes is that a truck can descend a long grade without overheating its wheel brakes. Some vehicles can also be equipped with hydraulic or electric retarders which have an advantage of near silent operation.

Transmission

Because of the wide variety of loads the semi may carry, they usually have a manual transmission to allow the driver to have as much control as possible. However, all truck manufacturers now offer automated manual transmissions (manual gearboxes with automated gear change), as well as conventional hydraulic automatic transmissions.

Semi-truck transmissions can have as few as three forward speeds or as many as 18 forward speeds (plus 2 reverse speeds). A large number of transmission ratios means the driver can operate the engine more efficiently. Modern on-highway diesel engines are designed to provide maximum torque in a narrow RPM range (usually 1200-1500 RPM); having more gear ratios means the driver can hold the engine in its optimum range regardless of road speed (drive axle ratio must also be considered).

A ten-speed manual transmission, for example, is controlled via a six-slot H-box pattern, similar to that in five-speed cars — five forward and one reverse gear. Gears six to ten (and high-speed reverse) are accessed by a Lo/High range splitter; gears one to five are Lo range; gears six to ten are High range using the same shift pattern. A Super-10 transmission, by contrast, has no range splitter; it uses alternating "stick and button" shifting (stick shifts 1-3-5-7-9, button shifts 2-4-6-8-10).  The 13-, 15-, and 18-speed transmissions have the same basic shift pattern but include a splitter button to enable additional ratios found in each range. Some transmissions may have 12 speeds.

Another difference between semi-trucks and cars is the way the clutch is set up. On an automobile, the clutch pedal is depressed full stroke to the floor for every gear shift, to ensure the gearbox is disengaged from the engine. On a semi-truck with constant-mesh transmission (non-synchronized), such as by the Eaton Roadranger series, not only is double-clutching required, but a clutch brake is required as well. The clutch brake stops the rotation of the gears and allows the truck to be put into gear without grinding when stationary. The clutch is pressed to the floor only to allow a smooth engagement of low gears when starting from a full stop; when the truck is moving, the clutch pedal is pressed only far enough to break torque for gear changes.

Theoretically, semi-trucks could have diesel-electric transmission, as electric motors have better torque at 0 RPM than diesel engines, but this would increase the weight of the cabin itself, at the expense of the cargo weight.

Lights
An electrical connection is made between the tractor and the trailer through a cable often referred to as a pigtail. This cable is a bundle of wires in a single casing. Each wire controls one of the electrical circuits on the trailer, such as running lights, brake lights, turn signals, etc. A straight cable would break when the rig went around corners, so a coiled cable is used which retracts these coils when not under tension. It is these coils that cause the cable to look like a pigtail.

In most countries, a trailer or semi-trailer must have minimum
 2 rear lights (red)
 2 stop lights (red)
 2 turning lights; one for right and one for left, flashing (amber; red optional in North America. May be combined with a brake light in North America)
 2 marking lights behind if wider than certain specifications (red; plus a group of 3 red lights in the middle in North America)
 2 marking lights front if wider than the truck or wider than certain specifications (white; amber in North America)

Wheels and tires
Although dual wheels are the most common, use of two single, wider tires, known as super singles, on each axle is becoming popular among bulk cargo carriers and other weight-sensitive operators. With increased efforts to reduce greenhouse gas emissions, the use of the super-single tire is gaining popularity. There are several advantages to this configuration. The first of these is that super singles reduce fuel consumption. In 1999, tests on an oval track showed a 10% fuel savings when super singles were used. These savings are realized because less energy is wasted flexing fewer tire sidewalls. Second, the lighter overall tire weight allows a truck to be loaded with more freight. The third advantage is that the single wheel encloses less of the brake unit, which allows faster cooling and reduces brake fade.

One of the major disadvantages of the super singles is that they are currently not as widely available as a standard tire. In addition, if a tire should become deflated or be destroyed, there is not another tire attached to the same hub to maintain the dynamic stability of the vehicle, as would be the case with dual wheels. With dual wheels, the remaining tire may be overloaded, but it will typically allow the vehicle to be safely stopped or driven to a repair facility.

In Europe, super singles became popular when the allowed weight of semitrailer rigs was increased from 38 to 40 tonnes. In this reform the trailer industry replaced two  axles with dual wheels, with three  axles on wide-base single wheels. The significantly lower axle weight on super singles must be considered when comparing road wear from single versus dual wheels. (Note that expensive, specially reinforced 385 tires approved for  do exist. Their market share is tiny, except for mounting on the steer axle.)

Skirted trailers

An innovation rapidly growing in popularity is the skirted trailer. The space between the road and the bottom of the trailer frame was traditionally left open until it was realized that the turbulent air swirling under the trailer is a major source of aerodynamic drag. Three split skirt concepts were verified by the United States Environmental Protection Agency (EPA) to provide fuel savings greater than 5%, and four split skirt concepts had EPA-verified fuel savings between 4% and 5%.

Skirted trailers are often combined with Underrun Protection Systems (underride guards), greatly improving safety for passenger vehicles sharing the road.

Underride guard

Underride protection systems can be installed at the rear, front and sides of a truck and the rear and sides of a trailer. A Rear Underrun Protection System (RUPS) is a rigid assembly hanging down from trailer's chassis, which is intended to provide some protection for passenger cars which collide with the rear of the trailer. Public awareness of this safeguard was increased in the aftermath of the accident that killed actress Jayne Mansfield on 29 June 1967, when the car she was in hit the rear of a tractor-trailer, causing fatal head trauma. After her death, the NHTSA recommended requiring a rear underride guard, also known as a Mansfield bar, an ICC bar, or a DOT bumper.

The bottom rear of the trailer is near head level for an adult seated in a car, and without the underride guard, the only protection for such an adult's head in a rear-end collision would be the car's windshield and A pillars. The front of the car goes under the platform of the trailer rather than making contact via the passenger car bumper, so the car's protective crush zone becomes irrelevant and air bags are ineffective in protecting the passengers. The underride guard provides a rigid area for the car to contact that is lower than the lip of the bonnet/hood, preventing the vehicle from squatting and running under the truck and ensuring that the vehicle's crush zones and engine block absorb the force of the collision.

In addition to rear underride guards, truck tractor cabs may be equipped with a Front Underrun Protection System (FUPS) at the front bumper of the truck, if the front end is not low enough for the bumper to provide the adequate protection on its own.  The safest tractor-trailers are also equipped with side underride guards, also called Side Underrun Protection System (SUPS). These additional barriers prevent passenger cars from skidding underneath the trailer from the side, such as in an oblique or side collision, or if the trailer jackknifes across the road, and helps protect cyclists, pedestrians and other vulnerable road users.

Several US states and cities have adopted or are in the process of adopting truck side guards, including New York City, Philadelphia, and Washington DC. The NTSB has recommended that the National Highway Traffic Safety Administration (NHTSA) develop standards for side underride protection systems for trucks, and for newly manufactured trucks to be equipped with technology meeting the standards.

In addition to safety benefits, these underride guards may improve fuel mileage by reducing air turbulence under the trailer at highway speeds. Another benefit of having a sturdy rear underride guard is that it may be secured to a loading dock with a hook to prevent "trailer creep", a movement of the trailer away from the dock, which opens up a dangerous gap during loading or unloading operations.

Semi-truck manufacturers 
Current semi-truck manufacturers include:

Asia-Pacific

 Asia MotorWorks (India)
 C&C Trucks (China)
 CAMC Star (China)
 China National Heavy Duty Truck Group (China)
 FAW Group (China)
 Foton Motor (China)
 Hino Motors (Japan)
 Hyundai (South Korea)
 Isuzu (Japan)
 Mahindra Truck and Bus Division (India)
 Mitsubishi Fuso Truck and Bus Corporation (Japan)
 SAIC Iveco Hongyan (China)
 Tata Daewoo (South Korea-India)
 Tata Motors (India)
 UD Trucks (Japan)

Canada and United States 

 Crane Carrier Company
 Freightliner
 Hino Motors (Canadian plant)
 Hyundai Translead
 Kenworth
 Mack
 Navistar International
 Oshkosh
 Peterbilt
 Caterpillar
 Volvo
 Wabash National
 Western Star
 Tesla

Europe

 ADR Group Trailer
 DAF Trucks
 Iveco
 Kamaz
 KrAZ
 MAN
 MAZ
 Mercedes-Benz
 Renault Trucks
 Roman
 Scania
 Sisu
 Tatra
 Volvo
 ZiL
 Jelcz

Other locations

 Al Kowary Industries (Bahrain)
 Ashok Leyland (India)
 BharatBenz (India)
 BMC (Turkey)
 Eicher Motors (India)
 Ford Otosan (Turkey)
 Volkswagen Caminhões e Ônibus (Latin America, South Africa)

Driver's license

A special driver's license is required to operate various commercial vehicles.

Australia
Truck drivers in Australia require an endorsed license. These endorsements are gained through training and experience. The minimum age to hold an endorsed license is 18 years, and/or must have held open (full) driver's license for minimum 12 months.

The following are the heavy vehicle license classes in Australia:

 LR (Light Rigid) – Class LR covers a rigid vehicle with a GVM (gross vehicle mass) of more than 4.5 tonnes but not more than 8 tonnes. Any towed trailer must not weigh more than 9 tonnes GVM. Also includes vehicles with a GVM up to 8 tonnes which carry more than 12 adults including the driver and vehicles in Class C.
 MR (Medium Rigid) – Class MR covers a rigid vehicle with two axles and a GVM of more than 8 tonnes. Any towed trailer must not weigh more than 9 tonnes GVM. Also includes vehicles in Class LR.
 HR (Heavy Rigid) – Class HR covers a rigid vehicle with three or more axles and a GVM of more than 15 tonnes. Any towed trailer must not weigh more than 9 tonnes GVM. Also includes articulated buses and vehicles in Class MR.
 HC (Heavy Combination) – Class HC covers heavy combination vehicles like a prime mover towing a semi-trailer, or rigid vehicles towing a trailer with a GVM of more than 9 tonnes. Also includes vehicles in Class HR.
 MC (Multi Combination) – Class MC covers multi-combination vehicles like road trains and B-double vehicles. Also includes vehicles in Class HC.

In order to obtain an HC License the driver must have held an MR or HR license for at least 12 months. To upgrade to an MC License the driver must have held a HR or HC license for at least 12 months. From licenses MR and upward there is also a B Condition which may apply to the license if testing in a synchromesh or automatic transmission vehicle. The B Condition may be removed upon the driver proving the ability to drive a constant mesh transmission using the clutch. Constant mesh transmission refers to crash box transmissions, predominantly Road Ranger eighteen-speed transmissions in Australia.

Canada
Regulations vary by province. A license to operate a vehicle with air brakes is required (i.e., normally a Class I, II, or III commercial license with an "A" or "S" endorsement in provinces other than Ontario). In Ontario, a "Z" endorsement is required to drive any vehicle using air brakes; in provinces other than Ontario, the "A" endorsement is for air brake operation only, and an "S" endorsement is for both operation and adjustment of air brakes. Anyone holding a valid Ontario driver's license (i.e., excluding a motorcycle license) with a "Z" endorsement can legally drive any air-brake-equipped truck-trailer combination with a registered- or actual-gross-vehicle-weight (i.e., including towing- and towed-vehicle) up to 11 tonnes, that includes one trailer weighing no more than 4.6 tonnes if the license falls under the following three classes: Class E (school bus—maximum 24-passenger capacity or ambulance), F (regular bus—maximum 24-passenger capacity or ambulance) or G (car, van, or small-truck).

A Class B (any school bus), C (any urban-transit-vehicle or highway-coach), or D (heavy trucks other than tractor-trailers) license enables its holder to drive any truck-trailer combination with a registered- or actual-gross-vehicle-weight (i.e., including towing- and towed-vehicle) greater than 11 tonnes, that includes one trailer weighing no more than 4.6 tonnes. Anyone holding an Ontario Class A license (or its equivalent) can drive any truck-trailer combination with a registered- or actual-gross-vehicle-weight (i.e., including towing- and towed-vehicles) greater than 11 tonnes, that includes one or more trailers weighing more than 4.6 tonnes.

Europe
A category CE driving licence is required to drive a tractor-trailer in Europe. Vehicles over —which is the maximum limit of B license—but under  can be driven with a C1 license. Buses require a D (Δ in Greece) license. A bus that is registered for no more than 16 passengers, excluding the driver, can be driven with a D1 license.

New Zealand

In New Zealand, drivers of heavy vehicles require specific licenses, termed as classes. For other types of vehicles the classes are separately licensed as follows:

 Class 3 – Medium Combination Vehicle: Any combination vehicle of GCW  or less, or any Class 2 vehicle.
 Class 4 – Heavy Rigid Vehicle: Any rigid vehicle of any weight, any combination vehicle which consists of a heavy vehicle and a light trailer, or any vehicle of Class 1 or 2 (but not 3).
 Class 5 – Heavy Combination Vehicle: Any combination vehicle of any weight, and any vehicle covered by previous classes.
 Class 6 – Motorcycle.

Further information on the New Zealand licensing system for heavy vehicles can be found at the New Zealand Transport Agency.

Taiwan

The Road Traffic Security Rules (道路交通安全規則) require a combination vehicle driver license to drive a combination vehicle.

United States
Some states (such as North Dakota) provide exemptions for farmers, allowing non-commercial license holders to operate semis within a certain air-mile radius of their reporting location. State exemptions, however, are only applicable in intrastate commerce; stipulations of the Code of Federal Regulations (CFR) may be applied in interstate commerce. Also a person under the age of 21 cannot operate a commercial vehicle outside the state where the commercial license was issued. This restriction may also be mirrored by certain states in their intrastate regulations. A person must be at least 18 in order to be issued a commercial license.

In addition, endorsements are necessary for certain cargo and vehicle arrangements and types;

 H – Hazardous Materials (HazMat or HM) – necessary if materials require HM placards.
 N – Tankers – the driver is acquainted with the unique handling characteristics of liquids tankers.
 X – Signifies Hazardous Materials and Tanker endorsements, combined.
 T – Doubles & Triples – the licensee may pull more than one trailer.
 P – Buses – Any Vehicle designed to transport 16 or more passengers (including the driver).
 S – School Buses – Any school bus designed to transport 11 or more passengers (including the driver).
 W – Tow Truck

Role in trade 
Modern day semi-trailer trucks often operate as a part of a domestic or international transport infrastructure to support containerized cargo shipment.

Various types of rail flat bed train cars are modified to hold the cargo trailer or container with wheels or without. This is called Intermodal or piggyback. The system allows the cargo to switch from highway to railway or vice versa with relative ease by using gantry cranes.

The large trailers pulled by a tractor unit come in many styles, lengths, and shapes. Some common types are: vans, reefers, flatbeds, sidelifts and tankers. These trailers may be refrigerated, heated, ventilated, or pressurized, depending on climate and cargo. Some trailers have movable wheel axles that can be adjusted by moving them on a track underneath the trailer body and securing them in place with large pins. The purpose of this is to help adjust weight distribution over the various axles, to comply with local laws.

Media

Television
 1960s TV series Cannonball
 NBC ran two popular TV series about truck drivers in the 1970s featuring actor Claude Akins in major roles:
 Movin' On (1974–1976)
 B. J. and the Bear (1978–1981)
 The Highwayman (1987-1988), a semi-futuristic action-adventure series starring Sam Jones, featuring hi-tech, multi-function trucks.
 Knight Rider, an American television show featured a semi-trailer truck called The Semi, operated by the Foundation for Law & Government (F.L.A.G.) as a mobile support facility for KITT. Also, in two episodes KITT faced off against an armored semi called Goliath.
 The Transformers, a 1980s cartoon featuring tractor-trailers as the Autobots' leader Optimus Prime (Convoy in Japanese version), their second-in-command Ultra Magnus, and as the Stunticons' leader Motormaster. Optimus Prime returned in the 2007 film.
 Trick My Truck, a CMT show features trucks getting 'tricked out' (heavily customized).
 Ice Road Truckers, a History Channel show charts the lives of drivers who haul supplies to remote towns and work sites over frozen lakes that double as roads.
 18 Wheels of Justice, featuring Federal Agent Michael Cates (Lucky Vanous) as a crown witness for the mafia who goes undercover, when forced into it, to fight crime.
 Eddie Stobart: Trucks & Trailers, a UK television show showing the trucking company Eddie Stobart and its drivers.
 Highway Thru Hell, a Canadian reality TV show that follows the operations of Jamie Davis Motor Trucking, a heavy vehicle rescue and recovery towing company based in Hope, British Columbia.

Films
 Duel, Steven Spielberg's 1971 film, features a Peterbilt 281 tanker truck as the villain
 White Line Fever, a 1975 Columbia Pictures film, starring Jan-Michael Vincent
 Smokey and the Bandit, a 1977 film featuring a number of trucks on the side of the bandit
 Convoy, a 1978 film directed by Sam Peckinpah, starring Kris Kristofferson
 Maximum Overdrive, Stephen King's 1986 film, featured big rigs as its primary homicidal villains
 Over the Top (1987 film), a 1987 film directed by Menahem Golan, starring Sylvester Stallone
 Black Dog, a 1998 film directed by Kevin Hooks, starring Patrick Swayze
 Primemover, a 2008 film directed by David Caesar
 Joy Ride, a 2001 film directed by John Dahl, starring Paul Walker and Steve Zahn
 Big Rig, a 2008 documentary film directed by Doug Pray

Music
 "Convoy", a pop song by C. W. McCall, spurred sales of CB radios with an imaginary trucking story.
 The eighteen-wheeled truck was immortalized in numerous country music songs, such as the Red Sovine titles "Giddyup Go", "Teddy Bear" and "Phantom 309", and Dave Dudley's "Six Days on the Road".
 The thrash metal band, BigRig, was named after these trucks.
 Country song "Eighteen Wheels and a Dozen Roses", made popular in 1987 by singer-songwriter Kathy Mattea.
 "Roll On (Eighteen Wheeler)" by Alabama tells the story of a trucker who calls home to his family every night while out on the road.
 "Papa Loved Mama" by Garth Brooks is about a trucker and his wife.
 "Truck Drivin' Song" by "Weird Al" Yankovic tells the story of a female trucker, sung by a male with a deep voice.
 "Cold Shoulder" by Garth Brooks is about a trucker stuck on the side of the highway during a blizzard, fantasizing about being home with his wife.
 "Drivin' My Life Away" by Eddie Rabbitt, a former trucker, co-written with Even Stevens and David Malloy, sings of the life on the road.

Video games and truck simulators

 18 Wheels of Steel series
 American Truck Simulator
 Big Rigs: Over the Road Racing (2003)
 Euro Truck Simulator
 Euro Truck Simulator 2
 Hard Truck (1998)
 MotorStorm and MotorStorm: Pacific Rift
 Rig 'n' Roll (2009)
 Rigs of Rods

Podcasts 

 Over the Road, a podcast series by Radiotopia on truck driving the North America / US

See also

 Air brake (road vehicle)
 Articulated lorries
 Articulated vehicle
 Brake
 Bus
 Cab over
 Containerization
 DAT Solutions (a.k.a. Dial-a-truck)
 Dolly (trailer)
 Drayage
 Dump truck
 Gladhand connector
 Hybrid vehicle
 Jackknifing
 List of trucks
 Loader crane
 Loading dock
 Lockrod
 Logging truck
 Long combination vehicle
 Oversize load
 Progressive shifting
 Refrigerator truck ("reefer")
 Road train
 Roll trailer
 Semi-trailer
 Terminal tractor
 Tank truck
 Tractor unit
 Trailer (vehicle)
 Trailer bus
 Train
 Truck
 Truck driver
 Truck sleeper

References

Notes

External links

 TruckNetUK.com, dedicated to trucking information in UK and Europe
 Ol' Blue, USA, safety and education in and around trucking in the US
 natm.com/ Promote trailer safety and the success of the trailer manufacturing industry through education and advocacy.
 Semitrailer truck dimensions

American inventions
Trucks
Articulated vehicles
Freight transport